Carvell Lee Ausborn (September 24, 1923 – December 1, 1973), better known by his stage name, Mississippi Slim, was a hillbilly singer who had a radio show on Tupelo's WELO during the later 1940s and recorded for Tennessee Records. Ausborn also gained fame among Elvis Presley historians because he was one of the earliest musical influences of the young Presley and once let him sing on his radio show.

Biography
Ausborn was born in Smithville, Mississippi. According to Peter Guralnick, he had taken up guitar at the age of 13 to pursue a career in music. He was inspired by Jimmie Rodgers, Hank Williams, Ernest Tubb and Ausborn's cousin Rod Brasfield, a then prominent country comedian who toured with Hank Williams.

Slim travelled all over the country with Goober and His Kentuckians and the Bisbee's Comedians tent show and even joined the Grand Ole Opry once or twice, largely on the strength of his cousin's connections. He also became known as one of Elvis Presley's first musical heroes and critics.

According to Bill Mitchell, Slim "was a good entertainer" who put on a "pretty lively show," primarily "love songs with comedy. The people really enjoyed it."

Discography
 1951 – "You’re Gonna Be Sorry" b/w "Memory Of You" (Tennessee 738)
 1951 – "Beer Drinkin’ Blues" b/w "I'm Through Cryin' Over You" (Tennessee 745)
 1953 – "I’m A Long Gone Doggie" b/w "I Know You Can't Be True" (Tennessee 794)
 1953 – "Tired Of Your Lies" b/w "Queen For A Day" (Tennessee 827)

References

External links
 The bopping honky-tonk style of the elusive MISSISSIPPI SLIM (1952–55)
 Mississippi Slim discography on Discogs
 Mississippi Slim – 78 RPM – Discography
 Pvt Carvel L. “Mississippi Slim” Ausborn

1923 births
1973 deaths
American country singer-songwriters
Country musicians from Mississippi
Grand Ole Opry members
People from Monroe County, Mississippi
20th-century American singers
Tennessee Records artists
Singer-songwriters from Mississippi